Le bourreau des cœurs (The Heartbreaker) is a 1983 French comedy film written and directed  by Christian Gion and starring Aldo Maccione.

The film was a commercial success, finishing 24th at the 1983 French yearly box office with 1,652,422 tickets.

Plot
Vittorio, an actor confined to figurative roles, dreams of becoming a movie star. After winning a television competition, "The King of Cinema", he was noticed by Japanese producers and hired to play the role of an actor in a film shot in Tahiti.

Cast
 Aldo Maccione as Vittorio Garibaldi
 Anna Maria Rizzoli  as  Ginette
 Jean Parédès  as Max
  André Nader as  Pedro
  Nico il Grande as  Jésus
 Jole Silvani as  The Mother
  Max Desrau as  The Father
  Hubert Lassiat as   The Grandmother
 Gillian Gill  as   The Sister
  Jean David Junior   as  Bébert
  Diego Ferrari  as  Jeannot 
 Guy Lux  as himself 
 Florence Guérin  as The Starlette

References

External links

French comedy films
1983 comedy films
1983 films
1980s French films